Veleta (from the Arab word "Balata", meaning cliff) or Pico del Veleta is the second highest peak of the Iberian peninsula and the Sierra Nevada.

The mountain can be seen from the city of Granada. Veleta's northern slopes are home to the Sierra Nevada Ski Station. The access road that takes one to approximately 10 metres below the summit is the highest paved road in Europe across the mountains from Granada to the western Alpujarras. This road was built before the creation of the Sierra Nevada National Park in 1999. It has since been closed to general traffic beyond Hoya de la Mora, just above the ski station. However, the road is still used by ski station employees, national park rangers, observatory staff, cyclists and walkers, and a microbus service also takes hikers up to Posiciones del Veleta, a viewpoint 3,100 metres above sea level. In summer it is a relatively easy walk up to the summit from there.

The Corral de la Veleta or Corral del Veleta glacier, at 37° N the southernmost glacier in Europe, disappeared in 1913.

The IRAM 30m telescope is located on the slopes of Pico Veleta, at an elevation of 2920 m.

See also
Sierra Nevada Ski Station
 List of highest paved roads in Europe
 List of highest paved roads in Europe by country
 List of mountain passes

References

External links

Profile on climbbybike.com
El Corral del Veleta

Sierra Nevada (Spain)
Baetic three-thousanders
Penibaetic System
Mountains of Andalusia